Woodcroft  may refer to:
 Woodcroft, Edmonton, Canada
 Woodcroft, Gloucestershire, England
 Woodcroft, New South Wales, Australia
 Woodcroft, South Australia
 Woodcroft (surname)